Yuvan – Live in Concert is a concert by Indian musician Yuvan Shankar Raja. The concert, Yuvan's second in his career, took place on Pongal, 16 January 2011 at the YMCA Grounds, Nandanam, Chennai. Following the announcement, popular Tamil television STAR Vijay agreed to collaborate, sponsoring, organising and marketing the concert, while airing a special television series about Yuvan Shankar Raja, with family members and prominent celebrities closely associated to him participating, besides producing a promotional music video, titled "I'll be there for you". The five-hour show, which was attended by 20,000 people, including several noted film personalities, was received very positively and considered a highly successful event. The concert was aired on 11 and 12 February, Friday and Saturday at 2000 hrs on Vijay TV.

Promotion

Yuvan Isai Raja
As a run up to the concert, STAR Vijay telecasted a 3-week, 14-part series, where several noted celebrities, film directors, actors, friends, who worked with him, and his family members participated and talked about Yuvan Shankar Raja and his music. Yuvan himself participated in two episodes of the show, which was hosted by film actor and RJ Shiva. The show was aired on weekdays at 8pm from 27 December 2010 to 14 January 2011.

The following celebrities participated in chronological order:
 Bhavatharini, Premji Amaran, Vasuki Bhaskar, Venkat Prabhu
 Vishnuvardhan
 A. R. Murugadoss
 N. Linguswamy and Na. Muthukumar
 Selvaraghavan
 Faisal, Bhagavathy and Brucelee (first part), Vaibhav Reddy, Premji Amaran (second time), Aravind Akash, Vijay Vasanth and Saravanarajan (second part)
 Ameer Sultan
 Silambarasan Rajendar
 Tanvi Shah, Harish Raghavendra, Madhumitha, Mukesh, Priyadarshini
 Karthik, Vijay Yesudas, Haricharan, Sathyan, Roshini, Priya Himesh, Suvi Suresh, Ajeesh
 Jeeva
 Karthik Raja

Furthermore, the episodes in the third season of Vijay TV's reality-based singing competition Airtel Super Singer during the second January week in 2011, was made a Yuvan Shankar Raja special episode, with every song suny by the contestants during the episodes being Yuvan Shankar songs.

I'll Be There For You
A promotional music video for the concert, titled "I’ll Be There for You", was also made, composed and performed by Yuvan Shankar Raja himself, who also appears in the video. Pradeep Milroy Peter, programming head of Vijay TV said, "When we asked Yuvan whether we could do a music video to promote the event, he immediately accepted it", further noting that the whole process, "right from penning lyrics, to scoring music," was completed in a week. The lyrics of the song was written by Na. Muthukumar, which, according to him, would talk about "the relationship the music director and his fans shared". The video was shot in three consecutive nights at the Prasad Studios on sets created by art director Santhanam, with Vishnuvardhan directed the video, Kalyan doing the choreography and Nirav Shah handling the cinematography, who used a Red Camera for the shoot. The music video was released on 29 January 2010 at Sathyam Cinemas, with directors Venkat Prabhu, Lingusamy and Ameer attending, and was first telecasted on television on the same day.

The concert

Setlist
 I'll Be There for You - Yuvan Shankar Raja
 Neethane (Sarvam) - Yuvan Shankar Raja
 Nimirndhu Nil (Saroja) - Shankar Mahadevan
 Pul Pesum (Pudhupettai) - Vijay Yesudas, Premji Amaran, Tanvi Shah
 Thakkuthey (Baana Kaathadi) - Yuvan Shankar Raja
 Thee Pidikka (Arinthum Ariyamalum) - Premji Amaran, Roshini
 Siragugal (Sarvam) - Javed Ali, Madhumitha
 Ezhezhu Thalaimurai (Goa) - Yuvan Shankar Raja, Venkat Prabhu, Karthik Raja, Bhavatharini, Premji Amaran
 Kodana Kodi (Saroja) - Suvi Suresh, Premji Amaran
 Idhu kadhala (Thulluvadho Ilamai) - Rinaldo J A (Contest winner)
 Ayyayo (Paruthiveeran) - Shreya Ghoshal, Sathyan, Mukesh
 Irava Pagala (Poovellam Kettuppar)
 Pogathey (Deepavali) - Yuvan Shankar Raja
 Chinnan Sirusu (Kunguma Poovum Konjum Puravum) - Javed Ali, Bela Shende
 Loosu Penne (Vallavan) - Yuvan Shankar Raja
 Loosu Penne (Vallavan) - Silambarasan Rajendar
 Evandi Unna Pethan (Vaanam) - Silambarasan, Yuvan Shankar Raja
 Kanpesum Varthaigal (7G Rainbow Colony) - Karthik
 Thuli Thuli (Paiyaa) - Haricharan, Tanvi Shah
 Oru Kal Oru Kannadi (Siva Manasula Sakthi) - Yuvan Shankar Raja
 Oru Paarvaiyil (Siva Manasula Sakthi) - Sathyan
 Merke Merke (Kanda Naal Mudhal) - Shankar Mahadevan, Bela Shende
 Idhu Varai (Goa) - Andrea Jeremiah, Ajeesh
 Kadhal Endral (Goa) - Yuvan Shankar Raja
 Ninaithu Ninaithu Parthal (7G Rainbow Colony) - Shreya Ghoshal
 Devathayai Kanden (Kaadhal Kondein) - Harish Raghavendra
 Iragai Pole (Naan Mahaan Alla) - Yuvan Shankar Raja
 Thathi Thaavum Paper Naan (Boss Engira Bhaskaran) - Karthik
 Vethalaya Potendi (Billa) - Shankar Mahadevan
 Jalsa Pannungada (Chennai 600028) - Rahul Nambiar, Haricharan, Premji Amaran, Venkat Prabhu, Karthik
 Oru Naalil (Pudhupettai) - Yuvan Shankar Raja
 English song - Ilayaraaja, Yuvan Shankar Raja
 Ariyadha Vayasu (Paruthiveeran) - Ilayaraaja
 Where Is the Party (Silambattam) - Mukesh, Priyadarshini

Attendees, speeches and performances
Speeches by:
 film director Vishnuvardhan
 film director Ameer Sultan
 film director Linguswamy
 film director Gautham Vasudev Menon
 lyricist Na. Muthukumar
 actor Arya
 actor Jeeva
 actor Jai
 actor Silambarasan
 film producer T. Siva
 actor Rajinikanth (pre-recorded message)
 actor Surya Sivakumar (pre-recorded message)

Other prominent attendees:
 Selvaraghavan and his fiancé Gitanjali
 Raadhika and her daughter Varalaxmi Sarathkumar
 Naresh Iyer
 Dayanidhi Azhagiri
 Vaibhav Reddy
 Krishna
 Arvind Akash
 Mahat Raghavendra
 James Vasanthan
 SPB Charan
 Silambarasan
 Subbu Panchu

References

External links
 Official website

2011 concerts
2011 in India